Border ballads are a group of songs in the long tradition of balladry collected from the Anglo-Scottish border. Like all traditional ballads, they were traditionally sung unaccompanied. There may be a repeating motif, but there is no "chorus" as in most popular songs. The supernatural is a common theme in border ballads, as are recountings of raids and battles.

Ballad types
The ballads belong to various groups of subjects, such as riding ballads like "Kinmont Willie"; historical ballads like "Sir Patrick Spens"; comic ballads like "Get Up and Bar the Door"; and those with supernatural themes including "Thomas the Rhymer" (also known as "True Thomas" or "Thomas of Erceldoune") and "Tam Lin".

Writings about
Some of the earliest known references (in Middle Scots) to the ballads appeared in The Complaynt of Scotland (1549). 
Sir Walter Scott wrote about border ballads in Minstrelsy of the Scottish Border, first published in 1802–3.
A. L. Lloyd said of the ballads:

See also
 Child Ballads
 List of the Child Ballads

References

Anglo-Scottish border
Border ballads
English folk songs
Northumbrian folklore
Scottish Borders
Scottish folk songs
Song forms
Traditional ballads